María Pedraza Morillo (born 26 January 1996) is a Spanish actress, dancer and model who gained international recognition for her roles in the series Money Heist and Elite.

Career
Pedraza was discovered through her Instagram account by film director Esteban Crespo who invited her to attend an audition for the lead role of his debut film Amar  where she obtained the role of Laura, joining a cast also made up of Pol Monen, Natalia Tena, Gustavo Salmerón and Nacho Fresneda.

Her second project as an actress was playing Alison Parker, daughter of the British ambassador to Spain, in the Atresmedia series Money Heist. The subsequent purchase of it by Netflix earned the actress both national and international recognition. At the beginning of 2018, Pedraza's participation in the second Netflix original Spanish series entitled Élite was announced, with fellow Money Heist cast members Miguel Herrán and Jaime Lorente.

Filmography

Movies

Television

References

External links
 
 

1996 births
Actresses from Madrid
21st-century Spanish actresses
Living people
Spanish film actresses
Spanish television actresses
Spanish female models